The Druid City Dragons were a World Basketball Association franchise in Tuscaloosa, Alabama that played during the 2006 season. 

The team was officially announced as Tuscaloosa's first professional basketball game at a press conference on Thursday, April 20, 2006. The team took its name to pay homage to the former Druid City High School, which has since been closed. The 21-game season included 10 home games at Central High School West Gymnasium. Tickets were moderately priced at $5 for adults and $3 for students in an effort to draw between 800-1,200 fans deemed necessary for the team to be financially sustainable. 

The team would fold following the 2006 season after finishing in 5th place in the Western Division with an overall record of 9-11.

Roster
 Najeeb Echols, power forward (5th overall selection in the 2006 WBA draft) 
 Emmett Thomas, guard/forward
 Rickey Gibson, guard
 Josh Warren, guard
 Jeremy Law, guard
 Patrick Culver, center
 Mack McGadney, guard
 Kareem Ward, forward
 James Hall, forward
 Brandon Robinson

2006 results
 April 22: Lost 104-97 at Arkansas ArchAngels
 April 24: Won 86-77 vs. Marietta Storm Najeeb Echols scored 15 points and had 10 rebounds before a crowd of 350 spectators in the season's first home game.  
 April 29: Won 114-84 at Anderson Heat
 May 5: Won 91-70 vs. Murfreesboro Musicians (at Tuscaloosa County High School)
 May 8: Lost 94-86 vs. Rome Gladiators
 May 12: Won 92-85 vs. Cartersville Warriors
 May 13: Lost 99-91 at Rome Gladiators
 May 19: Won by forfeit at Cleveland Majic
 May 20: Lost 90-88 at Rome Gladiators
 May 24: Won 82-74 vs. North Mississippi Tornadoes
 May 30: Won 110-108 vs. Rome Gladiators
 June 1: Won by forfeit at Cleveland Majic
 June 3: Lost 128-95 at Arkansas Arch Angels
 June 6: Won 117-103 vs. Cleveland Majic
 June 9: Lost 113-110 at Murfreesboro Musicians
 June 10: vs. Mississippi Hardhats
 June 15: Lost 139-121 vs. Murfreesboro Musicians
 June 16: Game cancelled against Magic City Court Kings
 June 17: vs. Cleveland Majic
 June 21: Lost by forfeit at Marietta Storm
 June 23: at Murfreesboro Musicians

References

World Basketball Association teams
Sports in Tuscaloosa, Alabama
Basketball teams in Alabama
Basketball teams established in 2006
Basketball teams disestablished in 2006
2006 establishments in Alabama
2006 disestablishments in Alabama